Abingdon and New Abingdon Apartments is a Historic building in Watertown, New York. It was nominated to be added to the NRHP in October 2018 and was added in January 2019.

References

National Register of Historic Places in Watertown, New York